Janusz Kasperczak (29 September 1927 – 16 April 2002) was a Polish boxer. He competed in the men's flyweight event at the 1948 Summer Olympics.

References

1927 births
2002 deaths
Polish male boxers
Olympic boxers of Poland
Boxers at the 1948 Summer Olympics
Sportspeople from Poznań
Flyweight boxers